Anar Castle (Persian: ارگ انار) is a Sassanian castle in Anar, Kerman province, Iran. It is 11,179 square meters large and has 8 towers.

History 
The castle was built during the Sassanian Empire and was later repaired during the Safavid Empire and used again. 

The castle's interior used to contain buildings that sometimes had 3 floors, but these were all demolished in 1981-82 for the reason of them being used by drug addicts as shelter.

It was listed among the national heritage sites of Iran with the number 30343 in February 6, 2011.

References 

Sasanian castles
National works of Iran
Buildings and structures in Kerman Province
Anar County
Tourist attractions in Kerman Province